Czarnków may refer to the following places in Poland:
Czarnków, a town in Greater Poland Voivodeship, west-central Poland
Czarnków, Lower Silesian Voivodeship, a village in Legnica County, Lower Silesian Voivodeship (SW Poland)